Aan: Men at Work (translation: Pride: Men at Work) is a 2004 Indian action film directed by Madhur Bhandarkar. It  features an ensemble cast consisting of Akshay Kumar, Sunil Shetty, Shatrughan Sinha and Paresh Rawal in the leading roles, while Jackie Shroff, Irrfan Khan, Raveena Tandon, Lara Dutta, Om Puri, Rahul Dev, Manoj Joshi, Rajpal Yadav, Vijay Raaz and Ravi Kishan played supporting roles. It was released on 4 June 2004.

Plot

Crime is at its highest peak in Mumbai, with it split in three ways. Gautam Walia, a ruthless businessman has one-third, Manik Rao, the Home Minister  has one-third and Yusuf Pathan, a big-time goon  has a third of the territory. The trio warns Raghu Shetty not to interfere with their business. Raghu pays no heed to their warning and ambushes Walia at a horse derby. Walia is alive, but Pathan kills Shetty's man, who carried on the hit. Shetty is then jailed. The crime rate rises with more smuggling, trading, and illegal activities soaring. Meanwhile, the Detection Unit cops of the Mumbai Crime Branch works constantly to stop this.

Senior Inspector Vikram Singh, who was a hero once upon a time in the crime department, now tends to handle the easy jobs. Inspector Appa Kadam Naik is an encounter specialist who goes after the henchmen instead of the bosses; he is married to Janki, and they have a son named Rahul. Head Constable Khaled Ansari is a happy-go-lucky cop and chews paan (betel leaf) all the time. Kelkar  is another cop who talks on the phone all the time. The four men's and the whole CBI's fate changes with the arrival of their new boss.

DCP Hari Om Patnaik  arrives and realizes that the other cops are not serious and that no one is following the rules and regulations. Hari has a girlfriend, Kiran, whom he promises to marry. He is hesitant about his promotion as he thinks that this promotion is done deliberately to kick him out, but he learns to accept it. He witnesses the way the others treat the henchmen and orders them to be released. But during an encounter at a bar, the henchmen kill Khaled, making the policemen seek revenge.

Vikram and Appa decide to join Hari and help him clear the city, starting with Yusuf Pathan's younger brother, Baba "Yeda" Pathan, by killing him. After that, they arrest Yusuf Pathan, which puts a halt to small-time criminal activities in Mumbai. Simultaneously, Raghu Shetty replaces Pathan to run the illegal businesses which Pathan was handling. During the climax, Appa dies in a trap set by Kelkar. Vikram and Hari track Raghu Shetty and a hawala trader named Hirachand Mehta at the Flying Club with the help of a tip given by Roshni Varma, Walia's keep to Vikram. The police try to block the plane at the runway, but to no use. Finally, Hari damages the left wing and the back engine of the plane with a helicopter. The plane crashes into a hangar. Shetty and his goons try to escape, but are killed. Vikram kills Shetty. Hirachand is arrested, and Kelkar's corrupt actions are caught by Vikram and Hari. If left alive, he will be bailed out by the lawyers, so Vikram shoots him.

The arguments in the court are in the favour of Walia and his men. During the break, Vikram and Hari threaten the corrupt judge to change his judgement. The judgement is in the acceptance of the police, and the case is closed. DCP Khurrana, Om, and Vikram walk out of the courtroom happily. Hari says that Mumbai is crime free. Vikram then shows a list of gangsters that had to be encountered by Appa, to which Hari agrees. He then meets Kiran, who says that she is proud of him.

Cast
Akshay Kumar as DCP Hari Om Patnaik
Suniel Shetty as Sub Inspector Appa Kadam Naik
Paresh Rawal as Head Constable Khalid Ansari
Shatrughan Sinha as Senior Inspector Vikram Singh
Jackie Shroff as Gautam Walia, a renowned and corrupt businessman.
Irrfan Khan as Yusuf Pathan, a Gangster in Pathan gang.
Raveena Tandon as Roshni Varma
Lara Dutta as Kiran Kumar
Preeti Jhangiani as Janki Naik
Om Puri as Police Commissioner Khurana
Rajpal Yadav as Apte
Manoj Joshi as Home Minister Manik Rao
Rahul Dev as Baba "Yeda" Pathan, Yusuf's younger brother.
Milind Gunaji as Ajit Pradhan
Ravi Kishan as Raghu Shetty, a Gangster or rival of Pathan gang.
Ajinkya Deo as Kelkar
Xing Yu as Goon of Raghu Shetty.
Vijay Raaz as Vaaman
Vallabh Vyas as Hirachand
Aanjjan Srivastav as Judge
Rajeev Mehta as Tawde (special appearance)
Gauahar Khan as in a special appearance in song "Nasha"

Music
Lyrics: Sameer 

"Dil Se Dilbar" - Kumar Sanu, Anuradha Paudwal
"Hamare Baad" - Shabbir Kumar, Udit Narayan, Ujwala, Sarika Kapoor
"Jab Tak Rahega" - Abhijeet, Anuradha Paudwal
"Hum Aapse" - Sonu Nigam, Alka Yagnik
"Koi Pyar Na Kare" - Shreya Ghoshal, Sonu Nigam
"Jugnu Ki Payal" - Zubeen Garg, Shaswati
"Nasha Nasha" - Sunidhi Chauhan
"Koi Pyar Na Kare" - Sonu Nigam

Reception
Taran Adarsh of IndiaFM gave the film 2 stars out of 5, writing ″On the whole, those who prefer hardcore masala flicks [with loads of action] to feel-good entertainers will like AAN. At the box-office, the film has better chances at mass-oriented theatres [single screens], not multiplexes. While the masses will love the action scenes, the critics, gentry and family audiences, especially ladies, may not really go for it. Business in circuits like U.P., Bihar, M.P. and Punjab should prove to be the best.″ H S Bunty of Rediff.com wrote ″The action is ripped off every Hollywood film you know and is relentless. The tuneless songs, mercifully only three, are played just partially in the first half. The script is like a train that keeps going on and off the track after being late for 40 minutes.″  

Shruti Bhasin of Planet Bollywood gave thev  film 7 out of 10, writing ″The film is no Khakee, but it is still engaging. I got to give props to the director for making a commercial film, but we were used to being hit by his bold themes. Frankly, you expect more from the final product. The show belongs to Akshay Kumar. He continues to improve with each film and he holds the movie together. Suniel Shetty is excellent in his part. Paresh Rawal is reliable and funny. Shatrughan Sinha's role leaves much to be desired, especially since he returns to the big screen after a long time. Out of the villains, Irfan Khan stood out. Music by Anu Malik is average with the Dilbar Se Dilbar and item numbers being the cream of the crop. The film might've had a bigger impact if there was no music. Another drawback of the film was the romantic tracks with Akshay and Lara Dutta. It seems forced into the script and slows the pace. Other supporting cast members get no room to shine. Recommendation to Madhur Bhandarkar: a decent attempt to make an entertaining film, but we expected so much more. Return to your roots for the next film! Recommendation for the audience: definitely worth watching."

References

External links

2004 films
Films scored by Anu Malik
2000s Hindi-language films
Films directed by Madhur Bhandarkar
Indian crime drama films
Indian action drama films
Films about terrorism in India
Indian police films
Fictional portrayals of the Maharashtra Police
2000s crime action films
Hindi-language thriller films
2000s masala films